John Black Aird  (May 5, 1923 – May 6, 1995) was a Canadian lawyer, corporate director, and political figure. He served in the Senate of Canada from 1964 to 1974, and he was Lieutenant Governor of Ontario from 1980 to 1985.

Life and career
Aird was born in Toronto, Ontario, and was the grandson of Sir John Aird, a prominent Canadian banker. He was educated at Upper Canada College, Trinity College and Osgoode Hall Law School. Aird was a Brother at the Toronto Chapter of Alpha Delta Phi.

During World War II, Aird served in the Royal Canadian Naval Volunteer Reserve. In July 1944, he married Lucille “Jane” Housser.

Aird practised law in Toronto and headed his own firm, Aird & Berlis, in 1974. He also served as a director of several corporations. In 1958, he was appointed to the board of directors of Callaghan Mining. He later was chairman of the board of Algoma Central Railway.

From 1964 to 1974, he was a Liberal party Senator. In 1971, he served as chairman of the Canada-United States Permanent Joint Board on Defence. From 1977 to 1985, he was Chancellor of Wilfrid Laurier University in Waterloo.

Aird was appointed an Officer of the Order of Canada in 1976, and he served as 23rd Lieutenant Governor of Ontario from 1980 to 1985. The main focus of his mandate was Ontarians with disabilities. He wrote a book, Loyalty in a Changing World, about the contemporary function of the Lieutenant Governor.

He was Lieutenant Governor when, 22 days into the 33rd Parliament of Ontario, Premier Frank Miller resigned following his Progressive Conservative government's defeat due to a motion of no confidence. The defeat occurred after an accord had been reached between David Peterson's Liberals and Bob Rae's New Democratic Party to allow Petersen to form a minority government for two years with NDP support, despite the fact that the Liberals had slightly fewer seats than the Tories. Some media outlets, such as the conservative Toronto Sun, compared the matter to the King-Byng Affair and accused Aird of partisanship for asking Peterson to form a government rather than dissolving the legislature and calling a new election.

Honours

In 1983, Algoma Central launched a ship named the John B. Aird. Aird had previously been chairman of the board of Algoma Central Railway.

After his term as Lieutenant Governor, Aird became Chancellor of the University of Toronto, his alma mater. He was made an Honorary Senior Fellow of Renison University College in 1985. He also served as Governor of the Royal Canadian Geographical Society.

Aird was appointed to the Order of Ontario in 1987, and he was promoted to Companion of the Order of Canada in 1992. He died in Toronto in 1995.

References

External links
 

John B. Aird archival papers held at University of Toronto Archives and Records Management Services

1923 births
1995 deaths
Canadian Anglicans
Lawyers in Ontario
Canadian senators from Ontario
Canadian people of British descent
Chancellors of the University of Toronto
Liberal Party of Canada senators
Lieutenant Governors of Ontario
Companions of the Order of Canada
Members of the Order of Ontario
Politicians from Toronto
University of Toronto alumni
Trinity College (Canada) alumni
Upper Canada College alumni
Osgoode Hall Law School alumni
Canadian King's Counsel
Law firm founders
20th-century Canadian lawyers
Canadian company founders
Royal Canadian Navy personnel of World War II